Mubarak Mohammed al-Otaibi (born 8 January 1986, Riyadh), known as Mubarak Mohammed A Alotaibi, Waqqas al-Jazrawi and Abu Gayth, is a Saudi Arabian man who serves as the Syria-based deputy leader for Islamic State of Iraq and the Levant operations inside Saudi Arabia.

History

He was designated a 'Specially Designated Global Terrorist' on 27 April 2017 by the US State Department.

References

1986 births
Islamic State of Iraq and the Levant members
Living people
Islamic State of Iraq and the Levant in Saudi Arabia